is a Japanese voice actor and singer from Osaka Prefecture. He is affiliated with Haikyō. He is best known for voicing Asta in Black Clover, Shinra Kusakabe in Fire Force, and Hitohito Tadano in Komi Can't Communicate.

Biography
Gakuto Kajiwara was born on 28 November 1994 in Osaka Prefecture, Japan. He stated that during elementary school, he loved to watch anime series Dragon Ball, which was re-broadcasting during that time. He also stated that it has led him to become absorbed in manga and anime.

In 2017, he landed a main character role as Asta in the popular anime series Black Clover.

On 8 March 2020, he won the Best New Actor Award at the 14th Seiyu Awards. The ceremony was originally scheduled to be held at the Bunka Housou Media Plus Hall before being cancelled due to the COVID-19 pandemic. The results were instead announced on the Chou! A&G radio program.

On 31 August 2020, Kajiwara made his musical debut, signing with Avex Pictures. His debut single "A Walk" was released on 25 November 2020, and was used as the twelfth ending theme for Black Clover.

Filmography

Television animation

Theatrical animation

Original net animation

Tokusatsu

Video games

Drama CD

Radio
 Flame Flame Norajiwo (2019) - Radiotalk
 MAN TWO MONTH RADIO Gakumon's Recommendation (2020) - Super! A & G +, AG-ON Premium

Awards and nominations

References

External links
Official agent profile 

21st-century Japanese male actors
1994 births
Avex Group artists
Japanese male video game actors
Japanese male voice actors
Living people
Male voice actors from Osaka
Tokyo Actor's Consumer's Cooperative Society voice actors